There are numerous days throughout the year celebrated as New Year's Day in the different regions of India. The observance is determined by whether the lunar calendar is being followed or the solar calendar. Those regions which follow the Solar calendar, the new year falls as Baisakhi in Bangladesh, Rongali Bihu in Assam, Puthandu in Tamil Nadu, Vishu in Kerala, Pana Sankranti or Odia Nababarsa in Odisha and Poila Boishakh in Bengal in the month of the calendar, i.e., Vaishakha. Generally, this day falls during 14th or 15th of the month of April. Those following Lunar calendar consider the month of Chaitra (corresponding to March-April) as the first month of the year, so the new year is celebrated on the first day of this month like Ugadi in Andhra Pradesh, Telangana, Karnataka and Gudhi Padwa in Maharashtra. Similarly, few regions in India consider the period between consecutive Sankarantis as one month and few others take the period between consecutive Purnimas as a month. In Gujarat the new year is celebrated as the day after Diwali. As per the Hindu Calendar, it falls on Shukla Paksha Pratipada in the Hindu month of Kartik. As per the Indian Calendar based on Lunar Cycle, Kartik is the first month of the year and the New Year in Gujarat falls on the first bright day of Kartik (Ekam). In other parts of India, New Year Celebrations begin in the spring.

Details
 Hindu religious festivals are based on Vikram Samvat. Not with standing the Purnimanta scheme of months that is in use in North India, the New year in Vikram Samvat starts from the first day of Chaitra Shukla Paksha.
 In Gujarat, the fourth day of Diwali is celebrated as the first day of the Vikram Samvat calendar month of Kartik.

Calendar view

See also 
Astronomical basis of the Hindu calendar
Diwali in Gujarat
Hindu units of time
Hindu calendar
Indian national calendar
Lunar New Year
Nyepi, new year in Balinese Hinduism
South and Southeast Asian solar New Year

Notes

References

External links
Bihu Festival 
Puthandu at baisakhifestival.com
Cheiraoba
Navreh – The new year day in Kashmir

New Year